The Intergiro was a competition in the annual multiple stage bicycle race the Giro d'Italia. It was first introduced in 1989. The calculation for the intergiro is similar to that of the general classification, in each stage there is a midway point that the riders pass through a point and where their time is stopped. As the race goes on, their times compiled and the person with the lowest time is the leader of the intergiro classification and wears the blue jersey.

Somewhere in the middle of the stage there was a point where the time of the riders was measured, in the same way as is done at the finish of the stage. The only difference was that the racers rode on after the intergiro point to the regular stage finish. Next to a time measurement, there were bonus seconds to earn just like in the regular stage finish. That way, riders who were in a group in front of the bunch gained time in the intergiro classification, and riders who were often in this position would have a good position in the classification.

The intergiro was a way for riders, who weren't sprinters or contenders for the GC, to fight for a jersey, and was in that way similar to a combativity award. There were racers that geared their whole Giro d'Italia to the intergiro classification, and calmly rode to the finish after the intergiro point was passed. However, the zest for the intergiro lessened over the years, to the point where there were only 2 to 3 racers contending the blue jersey during the last years. Therefore, the intergiro classification was replaced by a combination classification in the 2006 Giro d'Italia.

Intergiro Standings

References

Giro d'Italia
Cycling jerseys
Italian awards

de:Maglia Azzurra#Intergiro und Kombinationswertung